Acidity is a dystopian, cyber novelette written by Pakistani journalist and writer, Nadeem F. Paracha. Written exclusively for the website Chowk.com in 2003, it has gone on to become a controversial cult favorite among many young Pakistanis and Indians.

Plot summary

While recovering from his addictions, Paracha spent time rearranging these notes using the cut-up method and surrealist automatism.

He then turned it all into a work of fiction in which a heroin addict narrates his story set in future Pakistan and India that have turned into capitalist and theistic dystopias.

He is a traveler who is always moving up and down both the countries looking for drugs and in the process having hallucinatory dialogues with a Pakistani cleric/Islamic extremist (called in the book as "The Mufti"), a group of Hindu fundamentalists (called "The pundits"), a group of young neoliberals (referred to as "the fun young people" and the "polite voids"), and an aging Indian Christian (called the "Holy Father").

There are also many other characters, but much of the story revolves around these main characters as Paracha constructs his dystopia in which capitalism and organized religion have been fused together as a new totalitarian system.

Acidity makes a clear comment this way on the rapid economic, political and social changes taking place in India and Pakistan, especially after the end of the Cold War.

See also

Dystopia
List of dystopian literature
Social science fiction

External links
Acidity Pt: I, II, & III (Chowk.com) q

2003 novels
Dystopian novels
Pakistani novels
Novelettes
Novels set in Pakistan
Books about Pakistan
Novels about drugs
Religion in science fiction